Fort Phil Kearny was an outpost of the United States Army that existed in the late 1860s in present-day northeastern Wyoming along the Bozeman Trail. Construction began in 1866 on Friday, July 13, by Companies A, C, E, and H of the 2nd Battalion, 18th Infantry, under the direction of the regimental commander and Mountain District commander Colonel Henry B. Carrington.

The post was named for Major General Philip Kearny (1815–1862. A popular figure in the Civil War.  The fort should be distinguished from the similarly named Fort Kearny in Nebraska, which was named for his uncle, Stephen Kearny (1794–1848). Today, the fort and the nearby Fetterman and Wagon Box battle sites are maintained by the State of Wyoming as the Fort Phil Kearny State Historic Site.

Along with Fort Reno and Fort C. F. Smith, the fort was established along the Bozeman Trail in the Powder River Country at the height of the Indian Wars to protect prospective miners traveling the trail north from the Oregon Trail to present-day Montana.

Further building construction in 1867 required over 606,000 board feet of lumber and 130,000 adobe bricks.

The fort was under continuous construction and was nearing completion in December 1866, when its garrison was due to be re-designated the 27th Infantry. At its peak strength, the garrison numbered 400 troops and 150 civilians: 9 officers, a surgeon, and 329 enlisted men of five infantry companies of the 18th/27th Infantry, including the newly recruited Company K, 27th; one officer and 60 men of Company C, 2nd Cavalry, and 150 civilian quartermaster and contractor employees.

The fort, known to the Indians as the "hated post on the Little Piney", played an important role in Red Cloud's War. The area around the fort was the site of the Fetterman Fight in 1866 and the Wagon Box Fight in 1867. By 1868, the Union Pacific Railroad had reached far enough west that emigrants could reach the Montana gold fields through present-day Idaho, rendering the dangerous Bozeman Trail obsolete. All three forts along the trail were abandoned as part of the Treaty of Fort Laramie (1868). Shortly thereafter, Fort Kearney was burned by Cheyenne Indians.

Fort Phil Kearny, including the nearby sites of the Fetterman Fight and the Wagon Box Fight, was designated a National Historic Landmark in 1960.

Fort Phil Kearny State Historic Site
Fort Phil Kearny State Historic Site includes a visitor's center with exhibits, videos, a bookstore, and self-guided tours of the fort grounds and outlying sites.  The tour marks the archaeological remains of the fort's buildings.  A cabin built by the Civilian Conservation Corps (CCC) has been furnished to depict the period quarters of an officer's wife and a non-commissioned officer's quarters.  Visitors can also tour the nearby battlefields which are located within a five-mile radius of the visitor center and include interpretive trails.

In 1966, NBC televised "The Massacre at Fort Phil Kearny" on the anthology series Bob Hope Presents the Chrysler Theatre.

Fort Phil Kearny was also the subject of the 1951 movie Tomahawk starring Van Heflin, by Universal International (UI) Pictures.  The Internet Movie Database (IMDb) called the movie unusually accurate historically.  https://www.imdb.com/title/tt0044135/

References

Further reading

External links

Fort Phil Kearny State Historic Site - official site
Fort Phil Kearny State Historic Site - Fort Phil Kearny/Bozeman Trail Association

Phil Kearny
Pre-statehood history of Wyoming
National Historic Landmarks in Wyoming
Red Cloud's War
Wyoming state historic sites
Military and war museums in Wyoming
Museums in Johnson County, Wyoming
Civilian Conservation Corps in Wyoming
Phil Kearny
Protected areas of Johnson County, Wyoming
National Register of Historic Places in Johnson County, Wyoming
IUCN Category III